Wiwilí de Nueva Segovia is a municipality in the Nueva Segovia Department of Nicaragua.

Nicaraguan sources say it was founded in the 1920s. 
Wiwilí de Nueva Segovia is on the west bank of the Rio Coco; Wiwilí de Jinotega is on the eastern bank.  
Wiwilí borders the Bosawas National Natural Resource Reserve, the largest protected area in Central America.

External links
 Resources, Abundance and Competition in the Bosawas Biosphere Reserve, Nicaragua
 Wiwilí: multilingüe y multiétnico, La Prensa

Municipalities of the Nueva Segovia Department